The 1921 Marquette Hilltoppers football team was an American football team that represented Marquette University as an independent during the 1921 college football season. In its fifth and final season under head coach John J. Ryan, the team compiled an 6–2–1 record and shut out five of its nine opponents. The team defeated Michigan Agricultural and the Haskell Indians, but lost to Knute Rockne's Notre Dame Fighting Irish.

Schedule

References

Marquette
Marquette Golden Avalanche football seasons
College football undefeated seasons
Marquette Hilltoppers football